The 2004–2005 Talk 'N Text Phone Pals season was the 15th season of the franchise in the Philippine Basketball Association (PBA).

Transactions

Occurrences
Game one of the 2004–05 Philippine Cup finals won by Talk 'N Text, 89–71 over the Barangay Ginebra Kings on January 30, were placed under protest when the Phone Pals violated the PBA's suspension on Asi Taulava which the board refused to lift despite a recent Quezon City court ruling ordering the PBA to reinstate the Phone Pals' top player, the league forfeited the series opener in favor of Barangay Ginebra.

Roster

Philippine Cup

Game log

|- bgcolor="#bbffbb" 
| 1
| October 3
| San Miguel
| 93–89
| Telan (20)
| 
| 
| Araneta Coliseum
| 1–0
|- bgcolor="#bbffbb" 
| 2
| October 8
| Alaska
| 94–86
| Miller (22)
| 
| 
| Makati Coliseum
| 2–0
|- bgcolor="#bbffbb" 
| 3
| October 13
| FedEx
| 119–98
| Taulava (22)
| 
| 
| Araneta Coliseum
| 3–0
|- bgcolor="#bbffbb" 
| 4
| October 19
| Purefoods
| 109–87
| Miller (26)
| 
| 
| Dumaguete
| 4–0
|- bgcolor="#bbffbb" 
| 5
| October 22
| Coca Cola
| 96–77
| Pablo (27)
| 
| 
| Philsports Arena
| 5–0
|- bgcolor="#edbebf"
| 6
| October 27
| Brgy.Ginebra
| 80–91
| Miller (17)
| 
| 
| Araneta Coliseum
| 5–1

|- bgcolor="#bbffbb" 
| 7
| November 3
| Shell
| 80–63
| 
| 
| 
| Araneta Coliseum
| 6–1
|- bgcolor="#bbffbb" 
| 8
| November 9
| FedEx
| 103–93
| 
| 
| 
| Ormoc City
| 7–1
|- bgcolor="#bbffbb" 
| 9
| November 14
| Purefoods
| 94–86
| Miller (22)
| 
| 
| Araneta Coliseum
| 8–1
|- bgcolor="#bbffbb" 
| 10
| November 18
| Alaska
| 97–84
| 
| 
| 
| Cebu City
| 9–1
|- bgcolor="#bbffbb"
| 11
| November 24
| Red Bull
| 98–80
| 
| 
| 
| Cuneta Astrodome
| 10–1
|- bgcolor="#edbebf"
| 12
| November 30
| Sta.Lucia
| 102–104
| Miller (27)
| 
| 
| Puerto Princesa
| 10–2

|- bgcolor="#edbebf" 
| 13
| December 5
| Coca Cola
| 81–93
| Telan (16)
| 
| 
| Araneta Coliseum
| 10–3
|- bgcolor="#edbebf" 
| 14
| December 8
| Red Bull
| 96–105
| Telan (26)
| 
| 
| Philsports Arena
| 10–4
|- bgcolor="#bbffbb" 
| 15
| December 10
| San Miguel
| 97–82
| Telan (23)
| 
| 
| Araneta Coliseum
| 11–4
|- bgcolor="#edbebf" 
| 16
| December 15
| Shell
| 98–103
| Pablo (18)
| 
| 
| Araneta Coliseum
| 11–5
|- bgcolor="#bbffbb" 
| 17
| December 19
| Sta.Lucia
| 102–83
| Alapag (20) De Ocampo (20)
| 
| 
| Makati Coliseum
| 12–5
|- bgcolor="#edbebf" 
| 18
| December 25
| Brgy.Ginebra
| 102–108
| Alapag (39)
| 
| 
| Cuneta Astrodome
| 12–6

Recruited imports

GP – Games played

References

TNT Tropang Giga seasons
Talk